Ladislau Leonel Ucha Alves (born 9 May 1988), known as Leonel Alves, is a professional footballer who plays as a midfielder for Portuguese Liga 3 club Cova da Piedade. Born in Portugal, he represents Guinea-Bisssau at international level.

International career
Alves made his debut for Guinea-Bissau in an 2019 Africa Cup of Nations qualification win over Namibia on 10 June 2017.

References

External links 

For Portuguese clubs: 
 For Pafos: 
 

1988 births
Living people
Footballers from Lisbon
Association football midfielders
Citizens of Guinea-Bissau through descent
Bissau-Guinean footballers
Guinea-Bissau international footballers
Portuguese footballers
Casa Pia A.C. players
C.D. Olivais e Moscavide players
C.D. Tondela players
C.D. Mafra players
Sertanense F.C. players
Académico de Viseu F.C. players
Clube Oriental de Lisboa players
S.C.U. Torreense players
Pafos FC players
US Lusitanos Saint-Maur players
S.U. Sintrense players
C.D. Cova da Piedade players
A.C. Marinhense players
Liga Portugal 2 players
Cypriot Second Division players
Portuguese people of Bissau-Guinean descent
Expatriate footballers in Cyprus
Expatriate footballers in France
Bissau-Guinean expatriate footballers
2021 Africa Cup of Nations players